Wojciech Orliński (born 24 January 1969 in Warsaw) is a Polish journalist, writer, and blogger. In 1990s he was a member of the Polish Socialist Party. Between 1997 and 2021 he was a regular columnist for Gazeta Wyborcza. From 2011 to 2021 he was also the president of the Solidarity trade union at Agora, the newspaper's publisher. Since 2020 he has been working as a chemistry teacher.

He has written several books, including an alternate history novel (Polska nie istnieje), an encyclopaedic guide to Stanisław Lem (Co to są sepulki?), a biography of Stanisław Lem, three travel books and an essay on dangers connected with the development of the Internet.  He has also published science-fiction stories and opinion pieces in Nowa Fantastyka.

Works

Books
 Co to są sepulki?  Wszystko o Lemie (2007) – a book about Stanisław Lem
In 2012 an interactive version of the book was released for iPad under the title "Lemologia, czyli co to są sepulki?"
 Mark Barber – Urban Legends (RM 2007) – preface to the Polish edition and a chapter about Polish urban legends
 Ameryka nie istnieje (Pascal, 2010) – a book describing the author's journey across the US.
 Internet. Czas się bać (Agora 2013) - a book busting myths about the goodness of Internet and showing the dangers.
 10 lat emocji. Kino polskie 2005-2015 (Agora 2015) – a book about Polish cinema
 Polska nie istnieje (NCK 2015) –  the book, set in the early 21st century, follows a protagonist's journey as he travels across Europe and eventually to the US, encountering a world shaped by an alternate history where the 1877 US workers' strike had sparked a socialist revolution, leading to a vastly different political reality all over the world, with Poland among others not existing.
 Lem. Życie nie z tej ziemi (Czarne, 2017) – a biography of Stanisław Lem
 Człowiek, który wynalazł internet (Agora 2019) – a biography of Paul Baran
 Lem w PRL-u (Wydawnictwo Literackie 2021) – a book about Stanisław Lem during the Polish People's Republic
 Kopernik. Rewolucje (Agora 2022) – a biography of Nicolaus Copernicus

Short stories
 Retro ("Nowa Fantastyka" 11/1991)
 Śnieżka ("Nowa Fantastyka" 1/1999)
 Wszystkie szajby świata ("Nowa Fantastyka" 4/2007)
 Diabeł warszawski (Ksiega strachu anthology, Runa 2007)
 Socpunk ("Nowa Fantastyka" 2/2008)
 Stanlemian (Głos Lema anthology, Powergraph 2011, Lemistry anthology, Comma Press 2011)
 Conrad Street (Conradology anthology, Comma Press 2017)

Translations
 Isaiah Berlin – Karl Marx: His Life and Environment (Książka i Wiedza 1999) – Polish translation

External links
Wojciech Orliński's blogs:
 Ekskursje w dyskursie (Polish)
 Eastsplaining (English)

References

1969 births
Living people
Polish journalists
Polish science fiction writers